
Gmina Wadowice Górne is a rural gmina (administrative district) in Mielec County, Subcarpathian Voivodeship, in south-eastern Poland.

Villages
Gmina Wadowice Górne contains the villages and settlements of Borowina, Granica, Grzybów, Izbiska, Jamy, Kawęczyn, Koniec, Kosówka, Piątkowiec, Podlesie, Przebendów, Wadowice Dolne, Wadowice Górne, Wampierzów, Wierzchowiny, Wola Wadowska and Zabrnie.

Neighbouring gminas
Gmina Wadowice Górne is bordered by the gminas of Czermin, Mielec, Radgoszcz, Radomyśl Wielki and Szczucin.

References
Polish official population figures 2006

Wadowice Gorne
Mielec County